Iládio Amado (born 1976, Portugal) is a teacher of music education and also an instrumentalist and composer. He lives in Vila do Bispo, Algarve, and has performed all over the country as a member of various bands. He is currently a member of Tokamaki.

Career

Individual work 

 2014 - Advertising spots for Children's Rights for Radio Fóia, at the request of CPCJ Monchique. Two series were recorded for this initiative with schoolchildren participating. The transmission began on World Children's Day and is to culminate in the organization of 'I Days of Children's Rights', next November.
 2013 - Original soundtrack for Tesouras e Navalhas, solo and with Tokamaki. This documentary by Paradoxon Produções, directed by Hernani Duarte Maria had its premiere at the Library António Ramos Rosa in Faro. The video clip of Tokamaki, directed by the same director, was also displayed at the RTP International, RTP Asia and RTP America. Official Selection of the FARCUME 2014 (Faro), the Figueira Film Art 2014 (International Film Festival of Figueira da Foz) and the International Film Festival of Arouca 2014.
 2013 - Theme for the video clip "Beatriz" - 1st feature film of Paradoxon Producões, official selection of FARCUME 2013 and official selection of the Arouca Film Festival (2013). Transmitted on the TV channels RTP Internacional, RTP Açores and RTP África.
 2011 - Original soundtrack for "Faminto", directed by Hernani Maria Duarte and Pedro Noel da Luz. Winner Awards of CinEuphoria 2012 in the categories of Top 10 Voting Public, Best Photography, Top Portuguese Short Film and Best Supporting Actor - Official Selection of Shortcutz Lisbon and Porto, Lama Curtas (Faro), Film Festival of Avanca, Farcume, International Film Festival of Arouca, BragaCine 2012 and transmitted on Sic Radical. Selected and awarded for the XIII Edition of Sé Video in Faro (2012) and displayed in the Portuguese Cinematheque - Museum of Cinema in March 2013. Awarded with the 3rd Prize for national fiction in FICSAM 2013 (International Mental Health Film Festival of Faro);
 2011 - Original Soundtrack for 'Drink!' from Seventh Kingdom Productions, directed by Tiago Inácio!  Awarded with an Honorable Mention for new aesthetical visual images and photography and with the Best Actress Award in Bragacine (2011). Honorable Mention in Arouca Film Festival (2011). Official Selection of the 1st edition of Portugal Underground Film Festival and FICSAM 2013 (International Mental Health Film Festival of Faro);
 2011 - Original music and audio post-production of the documentary "Memórias da Nossa Senhora da Guadalupe", directed by Hernani Duarte Maria, Raquel Roxo and Elsa Freixial for the Secretary of State for Culture (Directorate of Regional Culture of the Algarve), presented during the European Heritage Days;
 2004 - Composition of Children's Ballet "A Celebração da Primavera", danced and presented by the students of 1st Cycle of Basic Schools in the municipality of Arronches;
 2002 - Composition and Children's Ballet presentation of "O Julgamento do Cuco" at the request of the Association of Parents of the Schools of Castelo de Vide, choreography by Maria Alcobia.

Bands, collaborations and other projects 

 2011 - Honorable Mention in the Grande ©  - National Creativity Contest for the Schools, in Music Category, with students representing the project of High School Julio Dantas of Lagos, as a teacher, coordinator and producer in the Final Ceremony organized by the Municipality of Cascais and the AGECOP (Association for Management of Private Copying);
 2010 - Co-author of the project, along with the writer Bruno Filipe Esteves, "A Palavra Longe de Aberta", which rises as synergistic expression and accomplice of the shared passion by the poetry and by the music with lusophone origin;
 2010/2014 - Guest member of Jury for the Concurso de Fado Cerveja Sagres, sponsored by the municipality of Vila do Bispo, with competitors from all the country;
 2009 - Arrangements and production of a song composed by Helena Tapadinhas for her book 'Contos do Mago'. This theme was produced under the Environmental Education Program for the Arts (PREAA) and presented at Planet Earth Lisbon Event in Parque das Nações, during the close of the International Year of Planet Earth, promoted by the United Nations and the National Commission of Unesco;
 2005 - Co-authored, along with André "IGOR" Teresinha, of the sound ambience WAD, which can be heard as part of permanent exhibition of the Museu do Rio - Guerreiros do Rio (Alcoutim);
 1999 - Ramaia, collective exhibition of Contemporary Art at EPAC, in Vila do Bispo;
 1999 - RAMa - collective exhibition of Contemporary Art at Galeria Alvarez, in Porto.

Discography

 2010 - Corolário - Limited Edition (250 copies)

External links
 Official Facebook
 Official Youtube Channel
 Iládio Amado at the IMDb (Internet Movie Database)
 Iládio Amado at SoundCloud

References

1976 births
Living people
Portuguese musicians
Portuguese male musicians
Portuguese film score composers
Male film score composers
Music educators
20th-century Portuguese educators
Portuguese schoolteachers